4-Fluoroethcathinone (also known as 4-FEC) is a stimulant of the cathinone class and structural analog of flephedrone (4-fluoromethcathinone) that has been sold as designer drug.

References 

Cathinones
Designer drugs
Fluoroarenes
Norepinephrine–dopamine reuptake inhibitors